The MRT Yellow Line is an elevated mass rapid transit line currently under construction in Bangkok and Samut Prakan Province, Thailand. The  line will have 23 stations and cost 55 billion baht. The line was originally proposed in 2005 by the Office of Transport and Traffic Policy and Planning to be a heavy rail underground line along Lat Phrao road and then elevated from Lam Sali junction to Samrong. However, it was decided in 2012 to build an elevated monorail line for the whole length in order to reduce construction costs.

The MRT Yellow Line will provide mass transit along the heavily congested Lat Phrao road and Srinagarindra road corridors. The line will link 6 other lines; the MRT Blue Line, interchange with the MRT Orange Line (which is under construction), the planned MRT Grey Line and MRT Brown Lines, the Airport Rail Link (Bangkok) and finally the BTS Sukhumvit Line. As such, it will be an important cross city link in the middle north-eastern and eastern areas of Bangkok.

Preliminary site works began in late 2017 with major construction work starting from March 2018. In October 2020, the BSR stated that they plan to open the first section of the MRT Yellow Line by October 2021 with initial operations running from Samrong to Si Iam. The line was then planned to fully open in July 2022. However, due to COVID-19 outbreaks in Bangkok delaying construction with sites closed, the BSR stated that the first section of the line will not open until July 2022. On 29 November 2021, daily testing began on a  section of the line between the depot at Si Lam and Srinagarindra 38 station. Testing will then be expanded after a 3-month period.

In mid April 2022, the Director of EBM/BSR, Mr Surapong Laoha-Unya, stated that further labour & installation delays would mean that the line would now not open until September 2022 from Samrong (YL23) to Phawana (YL2). The short section from Phawana to Lat Phrao would then open in early 2023.

By the end of November 2022, construction had progressed to 97.73%.The line will open in two stages.

Phase 1: May 2023 - Lat Phrao (YL01) to Samrong (YL23) -  (Control Group Public Trial Run)
Phase 2: June 2023 - Lat Phrao (YL01) to Samrong (YL23) -

Route Alignment
The line starts at the intersection of Ratachadapisek and Lat Phrao roads where it interchanges with the MRT Blue Line at Lat Phrao station. The line then heads east along Lat Phrao road to Bangkapi junction and south to Lam Sali station to interchange with the MRT Orange Line and the future MRT Brown Line. The line continues further south along Srinagarindra Road to Hua Mark where it will interchange with the Airport Rail Link at Hua Mak station.

From Hua Mark, the route continues south along Srinagarindra Road past Bangna-Trat Road all the way to Thepha Rak Road in Samut Prakan Province, then heading west along Thepha Rak Road where it terminates at Samrong and interchanges with Samrong of the BTS Sukhumvit Line.

The line will be built from Lat Phrao (YL1) to Samrong (YL23) and the depot will be located at Debaratana Road adjacent to Si Iam station (YL17).

History
The MRT Yellow line was first proposed in the mid 1990s as a monorail line by Japanese consultants with little or no progress for 10 years. In 2004, the Office of Transport and Traffic Policy and Planning (OTP) reworked the proposal as a heavy rail line with underground and elevated sections as part of the 10 line metro plan which was taken to the February 2005 election. In 2009, it was suggested to change the line to an elevated monorail line as a cost saving measure. In December 2011, the MRTA was instructed by the MOT to divide the MRT Yellow Line into two phases for tender and construction purposes and to reduce land appropriation costs. In June 2012, the MRTA contracted consultants to undertake detailed designs of the line. In February 2013, OTP stated that the tender for the MRT Yellow Line should be ready by late 2013 for tender in early 2014. By August 2013, this timeline had changed to a mid 2014 tender date.

However, similar to the MRT Pink Line, delays in finalising the technical requirements of the tender in relation to the selection of monorail rolling stock which determines the type of track to be constructed resulted in further delays. The subsequent political turmoil of late 2013 and early 2014 caused even more delays. Thereafter, a coup in May 2014 resulted in a new military administration and the tender being deferred while a review of all mass transit projects was undertaken for a period of 18 months. The MRTA was instructed by the junta government to change to a PPP tender process which was subsequently not released until mid-2016. In early December 2016, The BSR consortium consisting of BTS Group Holdings (75% majority stake) with Sino-Thai Engineering and Construction (STEC), and Ratchaburi Electricity Generation Holding (RATCH), won the bid construct and operate the MRT Yellow Line. The BSR also won the bid to build and operate the MRT Pink Line.

On June 16, 2017, the contract was signed for the project between the Mass Rapid Transit Authority of Thailand and BSR consortium. The BSR established the Eastern Bangkok Monorail Company Limited (EBM) to operate the line. A proposed 2 station extension of the route north from the Lat Phrao terminus to link to the BTS Sukhumvit Line at Ratchayothin station has also been proposed by the BSR Joint Venture. However, this extension is opposed by the MRT Blue Line operator BEM due to concerns regarding loss of revenue.

Construction Progress
Construction of the MRT Yellow Line began in March 2018 with the BSR consortium establishing a number of preparation work sites along the Lat Phrao rd with the closure of lanes along this traffic dense east–west corridor. By August 2018, construction had expanded to along the Srinakarin rd section which is also where the depot will be built. By 30 September 2018, overall construction had progressed to 9.61%. At the end of March 2019, construction has progressed to 30.40%. By the end of July 2019, civil construction had further advanced to 39.92%. At the end of October 2019, construction had progressed to 45.88%. By the end of January 2020, construction had progressed to 51.81%. By the end of May 2020, construction had progressed to 59.42%. At the end of July 2020, construction had progressed to 62.44%. At the end of September 2020, progress was at 66.31%. By the end of 2020, 1549 guide beams had been installed of the project total of 2388 individual guide beams. At the end of November 2020, construction had progressed to 70.64%. Construction progress was 77.97% complete by the end of February 2021. Construction progress had advanced to 82.46% complete by the end of April 2021. Construction progress was 85.53% by the end of July 2021. Construction progress was 88.14% by the end of October 2021.

On 29 November 2021, daily testing began on a  section of the line between the depot at Si Lam and Srinagarindra 38 station. After 3 months, testing will be undertaken at higher speeds and expanded to a longer section of the line.

Rolling stock
BSR selected Bombardier Innovia Monorail 300 rolling stock for the MRT Yellow line. The BSR has announced that they will purchase 28 4-car sets to operate the MRT Yellow line. These trains will be manufactured by CRRC Puzhen Bombardier Transportation Systems (joint venture of Bombardier Transportation and CRRC Nanjing Puzhen) in Wuhu, Anhui, China. The first set has been assembled and was shipped on 4 September 2020 with delivery to Thailand at the end of September 2020. The first set arrived in Thailand on 1 October 2020 at Laem Chabang port with a handover ceremony attended by the Thai Prime Minister, BTSC Chairman, MRTA and Canadian Ambassador. Two more sets arrived in mid December 2020 for a total of 5 sets by the end of 2020. By July 2021, 8 sets had been delivered and were being tested. As of the end of October 2021, 12 sets had been delivered. By the end of November 2021, the BSR stated that 20 sets had been delivered with the remaining sets expected to be fully delivered by the end of March 2022. However, as of mid April 2022 only 26 sets had been received and were progressing undergoing testing.

The remaining sets are expected to be delivered by July 2022.

Technical Characteristics
 Low profile vehicles/low floor height above beam 
 Distinct sloped nose/end-cap
 Inter-car walkthrough
 Rubber-tires and permanent magnet motor
 Aluminium body, steel underframe, composite end cap
 4-car sets have a capacity of 24,100 pax p/h each way and 8-car sets a capacity of 49.600 pax p/h each way with a 75-second headway.
Innovia Monorails are all fully automated and are equipped with CITYFLO 650 communications-based train control for driverless operation to increase reliability, shorten head ways between trains and lower maintenance costs.

The BSR has stated that the pax capacity for 4-car sets will be 17,000 p/h each way.

Guidebeams
The Bombardier Innovia Monorail 300 operates on a narrow, elevated guidebeam. Pre-cast, post-tensioned guidebeams are constructed at an off-site location and later installed on the system. Monorail switches are either beam replacement or multi-position pivot switches. The system will have evacuation walkways down the entire length of the guidebeam. These walkways allow passengers to escape any onboard hazard. The maintenance crew also uses these walkways for repairs and general maintenance to the system.

List of planned stations
The 30.4 km Yellow Line will have 23 stations (with a proposed extension of two stations):

Potential future extension
A proposed 2 station extension of the route north from the current Ratchada terminus to link to the BTS Sukhumvit Line Extension at Ratchayothin station has also been proposed by the BSR Joint Venture. However, this extension is opposed by the MRT Blue Line operator BEM, estimating about 988 million baht loss on the extension's first year of service and 2.7 billion baht throughout the 30-year concession period.

The extension was approved in February 2021, with construction set to be completed in 2024. However, EBM has repeatedly denied MRTA's request to provide a compensation for BEM, which may result in a cancellation of the extension if no decision has been made.

When completed the Yellow Line will terminate at Samrong. A future extension from Samrong across the Chao Phraya River to link with the MRT Purple Line at Rat Burana was canvassed by the OTP in the early 2010s. However, the location and design of Samrong station excludes any further extension of the line west of Sukhumvit rd.

Network Map

See also

 Mass Rapid Transit Master Plan in Bangkok Metropolitan Region
 MRT (Bangkok)
 MRT Blue Line
 MRT Brown Line
 MRT Grey Line
 MRT Light Blue Line
 MRT Orange Line
 MRT Purple Line
 MRT Pink Line
 BTS Skytrain
 BTS Sukhumvit Line
 BTS Silom Line
 Airport Rail Link (Bangkok)
 SRT Light Red Line
 SRT Dark Red Line
 Bangkok BRT
 BMA Gold Line

References

External links

 "MRTA Yellow Line website
 Airport Rail Link, BTS, MRT & BRT network map
 MRTA

Yellow line
Proposed public transport in Thailand
2023 in rail transport
Monorails in Thailand
Monorails